Ramalingeswara Temple is a temple located in Nandikandi, which is a village in the Sangareddy district, Telangana, India.

History 
The temple was built by the Kalyani Chaulukyas.

Description 
The shikhara is constructed with the Bhumija style, and the sanctum is star-shaped.

Location 
The temple is located less than a kilometer away from the National Highway 65.

References 

Hindu temples in Telangana
Sangareddy district